Blázquez is a Spanish surname. Notable people with this surname include:

Sports 
Adrián Embarba Blázquez (born 1992), Spanish footballer
Fátima Blázquez (born 1975), Spanish cyclist
Guillermo Bárcena Blázquez (born 1994), Cuban footballer
Joaquín Blázquez (born 2001), Argentine footballer
Joel Robles Blázquez (born 1990), Spanish footballer
Manuel Blázquez (born 1989), Spanish basketball player
Ramón Blázquez (born 1989), Spanish footballer
Sebastián Blázquez (born 1979), Argentine football goalkeeper
Sergio Blázquez Sánchez (born 1990), better known as Tekio, Spanish footballer

Other 
Antonio Blázquez y Delgado-Aguilera (1859–1950), Spanish geographer, historian and bibliographer
Eladia Blázquez (1931–2005), Argentine singer and composer
Fernán Blázquez de Cáceres ( 1364), Spanish nobleman
Jesús Blázquez (born 1962), Spanish historian, biographer and librarian
José González Blázquez (1630–1698), Roman Catholic prelate
Juan Blázquez de Cáceres ( 1229), Spanish soldier and nobleman
Ricardo Blázquez (born 1942), Spanish cardinal
Sandra Blázquez (born 1987), Spanish actress

See also